Marcel Kittel (born 11 May 1988) is a German former racing cyclist, who rode professionally between 2011 and 2019 for the ,  and  squads. As a junior, he specialised in time trials, even winning a bronze medal in the World Championships for cyclists aged under 23. When he became a professional in 2011, he specialised in bunch sprints, winning 19 stages across the three Grand Tours, and taking 89 wins in his professional career.

After retirement, he works as an ambassador for Endura and ROSE Bikes.

Career

Skil–Shimano (2011–15)

2011 season
Kittel made his professional debut in 2011 with the Dutch team . Known as a time trial specialist at the time, he won a bunch sprint during the Tour de Langkawi. After the success he decided to become a sprinter. He then won four out of five stages in the Four Days of Dunkirk, all in bunch sprints. Kittel won his first World Tour stage, winning the opening stage of the Tour de Pologne, a race where he also won three other stages. He also made his Grand Tour debut in the Vuelta a España, where he won the seventh stage beating Peter Sagan and Óscar Freire. He finished the season off by winning two stages at the Herald Sun Tour. Kittel became the second most winning rider in 2011 - with 17 wins.

2012 season
Kittel made his Tour de France debut in 2012 when he was selected as leader of his team, where he would compete for stage wins and the green jersey. However he withdrew an hour into stage 5, after suffering from a viral infection of the stomach and intestines from stage 2, the fourth retirement of the 2012 Tour. He bounced back at the beginning of August, when he won the first stage of the Eneco Tour, the first event in his return to racing. The only rider who was competitive with him in the final bunch sprint was Frenchman Arnaud Démare. He congratulated his teammates Tom Veelers and John Degenkolb for their work in the final kilometres, as they sheltered him from the wind before he propelled himself toward the finish line and the victory. At the end of 2012, as the cycling world was affected by the Lance Armstrong doping case revelations, Kittel took a vocal anti-doping stance by stating that he was "sick" of the people who still defended Armstrong in the cycling community.

2013 season
In 2013, Kittel's team  was promoted to the first division of the sport and was granted World Tour status. Kittel won the first stage of the Tour of Oman in a sprint finish, his first success of the season. In the Tour de France, Kittel found success as a sprinter. He finished first in the Tour's first stage in Corsica and took the first maillot jaune of the 100th Tour de France. Kittel was not done in this Tour, though, he would go on to win the 10th and 12th stages. On the final stage, Kittel triumphed again on the Champs-Élysées, ending the four-year winning streak of  rider Mark Cavendish. He would finish 4th in the Green Jersey points standings.

2014 season
Kittel started the 2014 season early by winning the Down Under Classic, followed by three consecutive stage wins at the Dubai Tour. On the third stage, he survived two short climbs near the end of the race and won the sprint of a greatly reduced group. In April he won the Scheldeprijs for the third time in a row, the first rider to achieve this. In the Giro d'Italia, Kittel won stages 2 and 3 in Belfast and Dublin respectively, but abandoned the race before it reached Italian soil. As he did in 2013, Kittel won the opening stage at the Tour de France and took the yellow jersey, but lost it to Vincenzo Nibali on stage 2. However, Kittel won both stages 3 and 4. He also won the final stage 21 on the Champs-Élysées in Paris, as he did in 2013. In September, Kittel won the opening stage of the Tour of Britain by outsprinting Nicola Ruffoni and Mark Cavendish. He also won the closing stage.

2015 season
In January, Kittel won the Down Under Classic in Australia for the second year in a row. By the end of April, he had competed in only two UCI races: the Tour Down Under and the Tour of Qatar. He failed to participate in any sprints in those races, as he was plagued by a virus. He returned to competition in May in the Tour de Yorkshire, but he dropped out after riding  in the first stage. He was supposed to make another comeback at the Tour of California but he withdrew days before the event, citing illness once again. He did ride the Ster ZLM Toer, but could not finish in the top 10 of a stage. At the end of June, it was announced that Kittel would not participate in the Tour de France, since his condition was not up to par. "Not being nominated [for the Tour] is without doubt the most difficult time of my career," said Kittel a day after his non-selection was made public.

Etixx–Quick-Step (2016–17)

2016 season
At the Dubai Tour, his first race of the season, he won two stages, the overall classification as well as the points classification. He carried on his successes to the Portuguese race Volta ao Algarve, winning stage 1 by a significant margin over André Greipel. He also won stage 4 and the points classification jersey.

2017 season
Kittel won five stages in the Tour de France, bringing his total of Tour de France stage victories to fourteen.

Team Katusha–Alpecin (2018–19)

2018 season

For the third year in a row, he chose to start his season at the Dubai Tour, but was unable to win any stages. Kittel took two wins in the 2018 season, both of which came at Tirreno–Adriatico.

2019 season
Kittel started the 2019 season strongly, winning the Trofeo Palma, part of the Challenge Mallorca, and taking second place at the Clásica de Almería. He pulled out of the Tour of California and the Tour de Yorkshire before the races started, citing health issues. This was a mutual decision by the team management and Kittel, who opted to take time off from professional cycling because of fatigue.

Kittel announced his retirement from professional cycling on 23 August 2019.

Major results
Source:

2004
 1st  Road race, National Novice Road Championships
2005
 1st  Time trial, UCI Juniors World Championships
 2nd Time trial, National Junior Road Championships
2006
 1st  Time trial, UCI Juniors World Championships
 National Junior Road Championships
1st  Time trial
1st  Team time trial
 1st Stage 3a (ITT) Trofeo Karlsberg
2007
 1st  Time trial, National Under-23 Road Championships
 1st Stage 4 Brandenburg Rundfahrt
2008
 1st Grosser Silber-Pils Preiss
 1st Memorial Davide Fardelli
 2nd Overall Brandenburg Rundfahrt
1st Stage 5
2009
 1st  Time trial, UEC European Under-23 Road Championships
 1st Stage 6 Thüringen Rundfahrt der U23
 4th Time trial, UCI Under-23 Road World Championships
 4th Neuseen Classics
 6th La Côte Picarde
 7th Overall Flèche du Sud
1st Stages 1 & 3
 8th Overall Le Triptyque des Monts et Châteaux
 9th Overall Tour du Haut-Anjou
1st Stage 4
2010
 1st  Time trial, National Under-23 Road Championships
 Tour de Moselle
1st Stages 2 & 4
 2nd Overall Mainfranken-Tour
 3rd  Time trial, UCI Under-23 Road World Championships
 3rd Overall Festningsrittet
1st Stage 2
 3rd Memorial Davide Fardelli
2011
 1st  Overall Delta Tour Zeeland
1st Stage 1
 1st ProRace Berlin
 1st Kampioenschap van Vlaanderen
 1st Münsterland Giro
 1st Amstel Curaçao Race
 Four Days of Dunkirk
1st  Points classification
1st Stages 1, 2, 3 & 5
 Tour de Pologne
1st Stages 1, 2, 3 & 7
 Herald Sun Tour
1st Stages 3 & 5
 1st Stage 3 Tour de Langkawi
 1st Stage 7 Vuelta a España
 2nd Rund um Köln
 3rd Trofeo Palma de Mallorca
 6th Trofeo Cala Millor
2012
 1st Scheldeprijs
 1st Omloop van het Houtland
 1st Münsterland Giro
 Ster ZLM Toer
1st  Points classification
1st Stages 1 & 4
 Eneco Tour
1st Stages 1 & 4
 Tour of Oman
1st Stages 3 & 6
 Tour de l'Eurométropole
1st Stages 2 & 3
 1st Stage 2 Three Days of De Panne
 1st Stage 2 Étoile de Bessèges
 2nd Handzame Classic
 3rd Grand Prix de Fourmies
 7th Grand Prix Impanis-Van Petegem
2013
 1st  Overall Tour de Picardie
1st  Points classification
1st Stages 1 & 3
 1st Scheldeprijs
 1st Omloop van het Houtland
 1st ProRace Berlin
 Tour de France
1st Stages 1, 10, 12 & 21
Held  after Stage 1
Held  after Stages 1 & 2
 Tour of Turkey
1st Stages 1, 7 & 8
 1st Stage 2 Paris–Nice
 1st Stage 1 Tour of Oman
 6th Overall Ster ZLM Toer
1st Stage 2
2014
 1st Down Under Classic
 1st Scheldeprijs
 Tour de France
1st Stages 1, 3, 4 & 21
Held  &  after Stage 1
 Giro d'Italia
1st Stages 2 & 3
Held  after Stages 2 & 3
 Tour of Britain
1st Stages 1 & 8b
 1st Stage 1 Ster ZLM Toer
 5th Overall Three Days of De Panne
 6th Overall Dubai Tour
1st  Points classification
1st Stages 2, 3 & 4
 6th Vattenfall Cyclassics
2015
 1st Down Under Classic
 Tour de Pologne
1st  Points classification
1st Stage 1
 6th Rund um Köln
2016
 1st  Team time trial, UCI Road World Championships
 1st  Overall Dubai Tour
1st  Points classification
1st Stages 1 & 4
 1st Scheldeprijs
 1st Grand Prix de Fourmies
 Giro d'Italia
1st Stages 2 & 3
Held  after Stage 3
Held  after Stages 2–6
 Volta ao Algarve
1st  Points classification
1st Stages 1 & 4
 1st Stage 1 Tour de Romandie
 1st Stage 3a Three Days of De Panne
 1st Stage 4 Tour de France
 3rd Road race, National Road Championships
2017
 1st  Overall Dubai Tour
1st  Points classification
1st Stages 1, 2 & 5
 1st Scheldeprijs
 Tour de France
1st Stages 2, 6, 7, 10 & 11
Held  after Stages 2–3 & 7–16
 1st Stage 1 Tour of California
 1st Stage 2 Abu Dhabi Tour
 1st Stage 3a Three Days of De Panne
 1st Stage 4 Ster ZLM Toer
 4th Münsterland Giro
2018
 Tirreno–Adriatico
1st Stages 2 & 6
 5th Rund um Köln
2019
 1st Trofeo Palma
 2nd Clásica de Almería

Grand Tour general classification results timeline

References

External links

 
 
 
 
 
 
 

1988 births
Living people
People from Arnstadt
People from Bezirk Erfurt
German male cyclists
Cyclists from Thuringia
German Vuelta a España stage winners
Presidential Cycling Tour of Turkey stage winners
German Tour de France stage winners
Tour de France Champs Elysées stage winners
2013 Tour de France stage winners
2014 Tour de France stage winners
German Giro d'Italia stage winners
21st-century German people